Bunny Johnson (born 10 May 1947 in Jamaica) is a retired boxer who was British heavyweight Champion in 1975 beating Danny McAlinden by a knockout, becoming in the process Britain's first Black Heavyweight Boxing Champion. He also enjoyed success in the light-heavyweight division and won a Lonsdale belt outright.

He finished with a 55 wins - 17 losses - 1 draw record.

Professional boxing record

|-
|align="center" colspan=8|55 Wins (33 knockouts, 22 decisions), 17 Losses (8 knockouts, 9 decisions), 1 Draw 
|-
| align="center" style="border-style: none none solid solid; background: #e3e3e3"|Result
| align="center" style="border-style: none none solid solid; background: #e3e3e3"|Record
| align="center" style="border-style: none none solid solid; background: #e3e3e3"|Opponent
| align="center" style="border-style: none none solid solid; background: #e3e3e3"|Type
| align="center" style="border-style: none none solid solid; background: #e3e3e3"|Round
| align="center" style="border-style: none none solid solid; background: #e3e3e3"|Date
| align="center" style="border-style: none none solid solid; background: #e3e3e3"|Location
| align="center" style="border-style: none none solid solid; background: #e3e3e3"|Notes
|-align=center
|Loss
|
|align=left| Steve Aczel
|TKO
|6
|18 Sep 1981
|align=left| Brisbane
|align=left|
|-
|Win
|
|align=left| Fatei Namoa
|KO
|6
|29 Jul 1981
|align=left| Gosford, New South Wales
|align=left|
|-
|Loss
|
|align=left| Tony Mundine
|TKO
|10
|20 May 1981
|align=left| Gold Coast, Queensland
|align=left|
|-
|Win
|
|align=left| Mike Quarry
|TKO
|7
|8 Feb 1981
|align=left| Sydney
|align=left|
|-
|Loss
|
|align=left| John Odhiambho
|PTS
|6
|12 Jun 1980
|align=left| Randers
|align=left|
|-
|Win
|
|align=left| Dennis Andries
|PTS
|15
|27 Feb 1980
|align=left| Burslem
|align=left|
|-
|Loss
|
|align=left| Sylvain Watbled
|PTS
|10
|10 Dec 1979
|align=left| Paris
|align=left|
|-
|Loss
|
|align=left| Lottie Mwale
|PTS
|10
|23 Oct 1979
|align=left| Wembley
|align=left|
|-
|Loss
|
|align=left| James Scott
|TKO
|7
|1 Jul 1979
|align=left| Woodbridge, New Jersey
|align=left|
|-
|Win
|
|align=left| Rab Affleck
|KO
|4
|13 May 1979
|align=left| Glasgow
|align=left|
|-
|Loss
|
|align=left| Mustafa Wasajja
|PTS
|6
|15 Feb 1979
|align=left| Randers
|align=left|
|-
|Win
|
|align=left| Dennis Andries
|PTS
|10
|22 Jan 1979
|align=left| Wolverhampton
|align=left|
|-
|Win
|
|align=left| Sylvain Watbled
|KO
|6
|14 Sep 1978
|align=left| Paris
|align=left|
|-
|Loss
|
|align=left| David Conteh
|TKO
|3
|7 Feb 1978
|align=left| Islington
|align=left|
|-
|Loss
|
|align=left| Aldo Traversaro
|TKO
|11
|26 Nov 1977
|align=left| Genoa
|align=left|
|-
|Win
|
|align=left| Terry Mintus
|KO
|1
|1 Jun 1977
|align=left| Dudley
|align=left|
|-
|Win
|
|align=left| Harry White
|TKO
|9
|17 May 1977
|align=left| Wolverhampton
|align=left|
|-
|Win
|
|align=left| Tim Wood
|KO
|1
|8 Mar 1977
|align=left| Wolverhampton
|align=left|
|-
|Win
|
|align=left| Phil Martin
|TKO
|10
|14 Dec 1976
|align=left| West Bromwich
|align=left|
|-
|Win
|
|align=left| Peter Brisland
|KO
|7
|27 Sep 1976
|align=left| Piccadilly
|align=left|
|-
|Loss
|
|align=left| Duane Bobick
|TKO
|8
|24 May 1976
|align=left| Munich
|align=left|
|-
|Draw
|
|align=left| Billy Aird
|PTS
|10
|21 Mar 1976
|align=left| Frimley Green
|align=left|
|-
|Win
|
|align=left| Fonomanu Young Sekona
|KO
|2
|1 Dec 1975
|align=left| Auckland
|align=left|
|-
|Loss
|
|align=left| Richard Dunn
|PTS
|15
|30 Sep 1975
|align=left| Wembley
|align=left|
|-
|Win
|
|align=left| Ray Anderson
|PTS
|8
|19 Jun 1975
|align=left| Oslo, Norway
|align=left|
|-
|Win
|
|align=left| Obie English
|TKO
|3
|12 May 1975
|align=left| Mayfair
|align=left|
|-
|Win
|
|align=left| Angel Oquendo
|TKO
|10
|11 Mar 1975
|align=left| Wembley
|align=left|
|-
|Win
|
|align=left| Pedro Agosto
|PTS
|10
|19 Feb 1975
|align=left| Manchester
|align=left|
|-
|Win
|
|align=left| Danny McAlinden
|KO
|9
|13 Jan 1975
|align=left| Mayfair
|align=left|
|-
|Win
|
|align=left| Oliver Wright
|PTS
|10
|21 May 1974
|align=left| Wembley
|align=left|
|-
|Win
|
|align=left| Koli Vailea
|KO
|3
|11 Mar 1974
|align=left| Mayfair
|align=left|
|-
|Win
|
|align=left| Roy Wallace
|TKO
|4
|18 Feb 1974
|align=left| Mayfair
|align=left|
|-
|Win
|
|align=left| Richard Dunn
|KO
|10
|11 Oct 1973
|align=left| Belle Vue, Manchester
|align=left|
|-
|Win
|
|align=left| Morris Jackson
|TKO
|5
|2 Jul 1973
|align=left| Kensington
|align=left|
|-
|Win
|
|align=left| Les Stevens
|PTS
|10
|5 Jun 1973
|align=left| Kensington
|align=left|
|-
|Win
|
|align=left| Guinea Roger
|TKO
|6
|30 Apr 1973
|align=left| Bedford
|align=left|
|-
|Win
|
|align=left| Roger Russell
|TKO
|5
|20 Nov 1972
|align=left| Wolverhampton
|align=left|
|-
|Win
|
|align=left| Billy Aird
|PTS
|8
|23 Oct 1972
|align=left| Mayfair
|align=left|
|-
|Win
|
|align=left| Guinea Roger
|PTS
|8
|11 Oct 1972
|align=left| Stoke-on-Trent
|align=left|
|-
|Win
|
|align=left| Roger Tighe
|PTS
|8
|27 Jun 1972
|align=left| Birmingham
|align=left|
|-
|Win
|
|align=left| Brian Jewett
|PTS
|8
|25 Apr 1972
|align=left| Birmingham
|align=left|
|-
|Win
|
|align=left| Eddie Avoth
|TKO
|3
|15 Mar 1972
|align=left| Caerphilly
|align=left|
|-
|Win
|
|align=left| Rocky Campbell
|PTS
|8
|26 Jan 1972
|align=left| Wolverhampton
|align=left|
|-
|Win
|
|align=left| Peter Boddington
|TKO
|4
|9 Nov 1971
|align=left| Wolverhampton
|align=left|
|-
|Win
|
|align=left| Brian Jewitt
|TKO
|7
|20 Oct 1971
|align=left| Stoke-on-Trent
|align=left|
|-
|Loss
|
|align=left| Dennis Avoth
|PTS
|8
|22 Sep 1971
|align=left| Solihull
|align=left|
|-
|Loss
|
|align=left| Richard Dunn
|PTS
|8
|13 Apr 1971
|align=left| Wolverhampton
|align=left|
|-
|Win
|
|align=left| Jerry Judge
|PTS
|10
|22 Mar 1971
|align=left| Mayfair
|align=left|
|-
|Win
|
|align=left| Dick Hall
|PTS
|10
|24 Feb 1971
|align=left| Wolverhampton
|align=left|
|-
|Win
|
|align=left| Billy Aird
|PTS
|8
|11 Nov 1970
|align=left| Solihull
|align=left|
|-
|Win
|
|align=left| Dennis Avoth
|PTS
|10
|19 Oct 1970
|align=left| Aberavon
|align=left|
|-
|Win
|
|align=left| Rocky Campbell
|KO
|4
|6 May 1970
|align=left| Solihull
|align=left|
|-
|Win
|
|align=left| Maxie Smith
|KO
|3
|24 Mar 1970
|align=left| Wembley
|align=left|
|-
|Win
|
|align=left| Guinea Roger
|TKO
|1
|14 Jan 1970
|align=left| Solihull
|align=left|
|-
|Loss
|
|align=left| Eddie Avoth
|PTS
|8
|27 Oct 1969
|align=left| Nottingham
|align=left|
|-
|Win
|
|align=left| Terry Daly
|TKO
|1
|29 Sep 1969
|align=left| Mayfair
|align=left|
|-
|Loss
|
|align=left| Roger Tighe
|PTS
|10
|27 Aug 1969
|align=left| Cottingham
|align=left|
|-
|Win
|
|align=left| Billy Wynter
|TKO
|1
|9 Aug 1969
|align=left| Bedford
|align=left|
|-
|Win
|
|align=left| Dennis Avoth
|PTS
|8
|7 May 1969
|align=left| Solihull
|align=left|
|-
|Win
|
|align=left| Hans Jorgen Jacobsen
|KO
|2
|10 Apr 1969
|align=left| Copenhagen
|align=left|
|-
|Win
|
|align=left| Peter Boddington
|PTS
|8
|25 Mar 1969
|align=left| Wembley
|align=left|
|-
|Loss
|
|align=left| Roger Tighe
|KO
|6
|2 Jan 1969
|align=left| Piccadilly
|align=left|
|-
|Loss
|
|align=left| Guinea Roger
|KO
|6
|20 Nov 1968
|align=left| Solihull
|align=left|
|-
|Win
|
|align=left| Lloyd Walford
|PTS
|8
|23 Oct 1968
|align=left| Mayfair
|align=left|
|-
|Win
|
|align=left| Lloyd Walford
|PTS
|8
|1 Oct 1968
|align=left| Wolverhampton
|align=left|
|-
|Win
|
|align=left| George Dulaire
|TKO
|6
|16 Sep 1968
|align=left| Mayfair
|align=left|
|-
|Win
|
|align=left| Guinea Roger
|PTS
|8
|12 Aug 1968
|align=left| Blackpool
|align=left|
|-
|Win
|
|align=left| Tommy Woods
|TKO
|2
|29 Apr 1968
|align=left| Manchester
|align=left|
|-
|Win
|
|align=left| Billy Wynter
|PTS
|6
|2 Apr 1968
|align=left| Wolverhampton
|align=left|
|-
|Win
|
|align=left| Paul Brown
|PTS
|6
|26 Mar 1968
|align=left| Birmingham
|align=left|
|-
|Win
|
|align=left| Roy Ferguson
|KO
|3
|6 Mar 1968
|align=left| Solihull
|align=left|
|-
|Win
|
|align=left| Bernard Pollard
|TKO
|3
|20 Feb 1968
|align=left| Wolverhampton
|align=left|
|-
|Win
|
|align=left| Peter Thomas
|TKO
|2
|8 Feb 1968
|align=left| Bristol
|align=left|
|}

References

External links
Official website

1947 births
Heavyweight boxers
Living people
Jamaican male boxers